Ungersheim is a commune in the Haut-Rhin department of Grand Est in eastern France. It forms part of the Mulhouse Alsace Agglomération, the inter-communal local government body for the Mulhouse conurbation.

It is known for:
 70 old, rebuilt Alsatian-style houses;
 many workshops of local traditional crafts with working craftspeople;
 the "Eden Palladium", a unique museum of old-timer carrousels and attractions still working;
 "Le Bioscope", a leisure park dedicated to environmental questions, proposing amusing and educating activities.

See also
 Communes of the Haut-Rhin department

References

External links

 Official site of the Écomusée d'Alsace  and German
 Official site of the Bioscope  and German

Communes of Haut-Rhin